The Bafut Wars were a series of wars fought in the early 20th century between the troops of the Fon of Bafut and German-backed troops of neighbouring fondoms and German troops.
The wars ultimately led to a defeat for the Fon of Bafut, forcing him into exile, and making the Fondom of Bafut part of the German protectorate of Kamerun.

Timeline

1889: The German explorer Eugene Zintgraff visits the town of Bafut after visiting Bali Nyonga, a neighboring fondom and rival to Bafut. Breaches of etiquette by Eugen Zintgraff with respect to the Fon of Bafut Abumbi I was looked upon as deliberately hostile acts instigated by the Fon of Bali Nyonga.

1891: German-led forces from Bali Nyonga attacked Mankon - an ally of Bafut. The attack was a reprisal of the death of two of Eugene Zintgraff's messengers sent to Bafut to demand ivory. The town of Mankon was burnt down by the force on January 31, 1891. Warriors from Bafut and Mankon attacked the attacking force on their return journey and inflicted heavy losses on them. This is the Battle of Mankon.

1901 - 1907: The German Schutztruppe, initially under the Schutztruppe commander von Pavel raided Bafut several times in 1901, 1904–1905 and 1907. This resulted in the exile of the Fon of Bafut Abumbi I to Douala for a year. He was reinstated under German rule as no suitable proxy rulers could be found.

The military headquarters of Abumbi I during the Bafut Wars at Mankaha in Bafut now houses a war memorial to the Bafut people. The guest house (which was the residence for the Fon built by the Germans) at the present palace of the Fon houses a museum.  The museum houses a special section on the Battle of Mankon, with the skulls of four dead German soldiers, their arms and ammunition.

Commentary
Prof. Benny Ambrose Akonteh, Ph.D., notes as follows:

"It is important to recognize that perhaps as early as the 19th century Bafut was an expansionary empire that invaded and subjected neighboring kingdoms such as Babanki Tungo, Big Babanki, Bambili, Bafreng, Bambui, and the Mbunti (Lower Mezam) to its rule. Many of the weaker Kingdoms voluntarily subjected themselves to Bafut, a clear example of which are the Baforchu and Mbakong people who sought refuge in Bafut during the tribal wars. The only exception to this is the Bawum people who first came to what is currently called Bafut, independently from Alanteh (Modern Mendakwe) and seat of the old provincial government. The legend from Bafut leaders such as Raphael Chimeba Akonteh indicates, that before its final defeat by the Germans, the Bafut Empire had defeated the Germans several times during wars that lasted more than seven years. It is also important to note that the Fon was exiled to one of the coastal islands of Cameroun most probably the island of Fernando Po. Some say it was Bota Island but my grandmother, Paulina Lumniba, who accompanied the Fon on exile, narrates tales of their ordeals in Fernando Po and their conversion to christianity with clarity and proves her point with the production of parched casava ("garri") an apparent stable food of the island of Fernando Po. She may just be right as to where they were in exile. The chronology of the wars seem to lend credence to the belief of a seven-year war with the Germans. It is also reflected in the pride and arrogant behavior exhibited by descendant of Bafut. Further, it is even more reflective in the titles assumed by the Fons of Bafut. Abumbi means "Conqueror of the World", a title the Fon assumed after subjecting most of the neighboring kingdoms to his rule through warfare. "Achirimbi" means "Protector of the World", a title assumed when the conquest was complete, and most small kingdoms sought refuge through alliances with the reigns of the Fon of Bafut. The title "Fon" is a misnomer, since the many conquests consecrated the rulers of Bafut as the "Emperors" of vast regions of what is today the Northwest Province of Cameroun."

References
The Cameroon Tribune, No. 600, p. 2, December 26, 1996

Kamerun
20th century in Cameroon
20th-century conflicts
Conflicts involving the German Empire
Wars involving Germany